Say I Am You is the second album released by indie folk band The Weepies and their first full-length record. It was released on Nettwerk Records on March 7, 2006. Sing Out! described the album as "tuneful, quiet pop that borrows a thing or two from folk." The thirteen tracks were co-written by Deb Talan and Steve Tannen, who alternate between lead and harmony vocals in various tracks.

Several songs from the album were featured in television shows and films:
 "Gotta Have You" appeared in an episode of the sitcom How I Met Your Mother and a Chinese audio-drama Foxy Guy
 "World Spins Madly On" appeared in the film Because I Said So, an episode of One Tree Hill, an episode of Life Unexpected, the episode "My Déjà Vu, My Déjà Vu" of Scrubs, an episode of Up All Night, an episode of Greek”, and an episode of Sense8
 "Painting by Chagall" appeared in the 2007 film The Heartbreak Kid
 "Stars" appeared in a 2007 Old Navy winter advertisement
 "Living in Twilight" appeared in the episode "Legacy" of "Greek", and the episode "Touched by an 'A'-ngel" of "Pretty Little Liars"

Track listing

Personnel
Deb Talan – vocals, guitar, keyboard, percussion
Steve Tannen – vocals, guitar, keyboard, percussion
Frank Lenz – drums
Erik Klass – drums
Whynot Jansveld – bass, electric guitar, baritone guitar
Meghan Toohey – keyboard, electric guitars
Joe Ross – mixing
Matt Searle – mixing

References

2006 albums
The Weepies albums